The 2011 Morocco Tennis Tour – Casablanca was a professional tennis tournament played on clay courts. It was the first edition of the tournament which is part of the 2011 ATP Challenger Tour. It took place in Casablanca, Morocco between February 21 and 27, 2011.

ATP entrants

Seeds

 Rankings are as of February 14, 2011.

Other entrants
The following players received wildcards into the singles main draw:
  Anas Fattar
  Hicham Khaddari
  Talal Ouahabi
  Younès Rachidi

The following players received entry from the qualifying draw:
  Evgeny Donskoy
  Adrián Menéndez Maceiras
  Deniss Pavlovs
  João Sousa

Champions

Singles

 Evgeny Donskoy def.  Alessio di Mauro, 2–6, 6–3, 6–3

Doubles

 Guillermo Alcaide /  Adrián Menéndez def.  Leonardo Tavares /  Simone Vagnozzi, 6–2, 6–1

External links
Official Website
ITF Search 
ATP official site

Casablanca
2011